Thomas Jefferson Byrd (June 25, 1950 – October 3, 2020) was an American character actor who played in several of director Spike Lee's films. He was nominated for the Tony Award for Best Featured Actor in a Play for his performance in the 2003 Broadway revival of Ma Rainey's Black Bottom.

Career 
Byrd earned a Bachelor of Science degree in education from Morris Brown College and later received a Master of Fine Arts degree in dance from California Institute of the Arts. He was a member of Omega Psi Phi fraternity, Alpha Sigma chapter.

Byrd starred in numerous regional stage productions including the San Diego Repertory Theatre's award-winning performance of Spunk. He also starred in Home by Samm-Art Evans, Two Trains Running, The Piano Lesson and Ma Rainey's Black Bottom at the Alliance Theater, Flyin' West, Hamlet and Miss Evers' Boys at the Indiana Repertory, and in other productions of Flyin' West at the Brooklyn Academy of Music and at the Long Wharf Theatre. 

For his Broadway debut, a performance in the 2003 revival of Ma Rainey's Black Bottom, Byrd received a Tony Award nomination for best featured actor.

Byrd appeared in several films by Spike Lee, including Clockers, Get on the Bus, Bamboozled, Red Hook Summer, and Chi-Raq.  Byrd also appeared as Stokely Darling in Lee's Netflix series She's Gotta Have It.  His other films credits include Set It Off, Ray, and Brooklyn's Finest.

Death 

After an emergency call was made in Atlanta, Georgia, around 1:45 a.m. on October 3, 2020, Byrd was found unresponsive with multiple gunshot wounds in his back and pronounced dead. He was 70. A spokesperson for Atlanta police said that homicide detectives were "working to determine the circumstances surrounding the incident". On October 17, 2020, a 30-year-old man was arrested for having a connection to Byrd's murder.

Work

Film

Television

Theatre

Source:

Awards and nominations

References

External links

1950 births
2020 deaths
20th-century American male actors
21st-century American male actors
American male film actors
American male television actors
Male actors from Georgia (U.S. state)
People from Griffin, Georgia
Theatre World Award winners
California Institute of the Arts alumni
Morris Brown College alumni
Deaths by firearm in Georgia (U.S. state)